Empress Wu Tse-Tien (translit. Wu Ze Tian) is a 1963 Hong Kong drama film directed by Li Han Hsiang, about the life of Empress Wu Zetian. It was entered into the 1963 Cannes Film Festival.

Cast

 Li Li-Hua as Wu Zetian
 Zhao Lei as Emperor Gaozong of Tang
 Diana Chang Chung Wen as Empress Wang
 Chun Yen as Xu Yougong
 Grace Ting Ning as Shangguan Wan'er
 Chuang Chiao as Crown Prince Zhanghuai
 Paul Chang as Zhang Yizhi
 Ying Choi Cheung as Zhang Changzong
 Kao Pao-shu as Lady Shangguan
 Wei Lo as Pei Yan
 King Hu as Zhao Daosheng
 Mu Zhu as outspoken man at restaurant

References

External links

1963 films
1963 drama films
Hong Kong drama films
Hong Kong black-and-white films
1960s Mandarin-language films
Films directed by Li Han-hsiang
Works about Wu Zetian
Cultural depictions of Wu Zetian
Films set in 7th-century Tang dynasty